George Elwood Hunt Jr. (August 1, 1916 – September 3, 1999) was an American rower, an Olympic gold medallist at Berlin 1936.

Hunt took up rowing at the University of Washington. He rowed in UW senior varsity eights which won US national Intercollegiate Rowing Association titles in 1936 and 1937. At the 1936 Summer Olympics, he won the gold medal rowing in the six seat of the American boat in the men's eight competition.

An engineering graduate, Hunt served as a Seabee in the South-Pacific theatre of WWII. He founded construction firms in Seattle and consulted on The Burien Library and Seattle University's Lemieux Library. He worked in the Port of Seattle's engineering department before retiring in 1980.

References

External links
 
 
 
 

1916 births
1999 deaths
Rowers at the 1936 Summer Olympics
Olympic gold medalists for the United States in rowing
American male rowers
Medalists at the 1936 Summer Olympics